Richard H. Pildes is the Sudler Family Professor of Constitutional Law at the New York University School of Law and a leading expert on constitutional law, the Supreme Court, the system of government in the United States, and legal issues concerning the structure of democracy, including election law. He is one of the nation's leading scholars of public law and a specialist in legal issues affecting democracy.

Early life and education 
The son of two Chicago-area physicians, Pildes graduated summa cum laude with an A.B. in chemistry from Princeton University in 1979 after completing a 74-page long senior thesis titled "Infrared Laser Induced Gas-Surface Interactions." He later received his J.D. magna cum laude from Harvard Law School in 1983, where he was the Supreme Court Editor on the Harvard Law Review. He clerked for Judge Abner J. Mikva of the U.S. Court of Appeals for the District of Columbia and for Justice Thurgood Marshall of the U.S. Supreme Court, after which he practiced law in Boston.

Academic career 
He began his academic career at the University of Michigan Law School, where he was assistant and then full professor of law from 1988 until 1999, when he joined the NYU School of Law faculty. He has been a visiting professor at the University of Chicago Law School, Harvard Law School, and Yale Law School.

In the area of legal issues concerning democracy, Pildes, along with the co-authors of his widely used casebook, The Law of Democracy (5th ed. 2016), helped to create a new field of study in law schools. Pildes is a leading scholar on the topics of the Voting Rights Act, voting rights, political parties, campaign finance, alternative voting systems (such as cumulative voting), the history of disfranchisement in the United States, and the general relationship between constitutional law and democratic politics in the design of democratic institutions themselves. He has also written extensive on the Supreme Court, the separation of powers, the powers of the President.  His work in these areas has been frequently cited in United States Supreme Court and other court opinions. He has also contributed significantly in the area of legal theory, where he has written on expressive theories of law.

In addition to his scholarship, Pildes is a frequent litigator in numerous major cases involving public law issues.  He successfully argued before the United States Supreme Court a major case from Alabama involving the unconstitutional use of race in redistricting, and was also counsel before the Supreme Court in a successful challenge exposing secret judicial proceedings in the United States Tax Court.  He was part of the legal team challenging before the Supreme Court partisan gerrymandering, in the recent Rucho v. Common Cause case out of North Carolina (2019).  He represented all the living former Chairs of the SEC in defending the Sarbanes-Oxley Act before the Supreme Court.

Professor Pildes is also a frequent public commentator and author on constitutional and election-law issues.  He was part of the NBC Team, working with Tom Brokaw, that was nominated for an Emmy for its coverage of the 2000 Presidential election United States presidential election. For the 2020 election, he has been retained as an Election Analyst for CNN.  He is also an active public intellectual and has written frequently for the Washington Post, The New York Times, The Wall Street Journal, The New Republic, The American Prospect, The Hill, Politico, and other such publications. He was assisted with one of his casebooks by then-University of Chicago Law School lecturer Barack Obama.
Pildes was elected as a member of the American Academy of Arts and Sciences in 2008 and as a member of the American Law Institute.  He received a Guggenheim Fellowship and was honored as a Carnegie Scholar.

Representative bibliography
The Law of Democracy: Legal Structure of the Political Process with Pamela S. Karlan, Samuel Issacharoff. 2nd ed. (2001).
When Elections Go Bad: The Law of Democracy and the Presidential Election of 2000 with Pamela S. Karlan, Samuel Issacharoff. Rev. ed. (2001).
The Future of the Voting Rights Act with David Epstein, Rodolfo de la Garza and Sharyn O'Halloran.
"Separation of Parties, Not Powers." with Daryl Levinson. 119 Harvard Law Review 2311 (2006).
"The Supreme Court, 2003 Term-Foreword: The Constitutionalization of Democratic Politics." 118 Harvard Law Review 29 (2004).
"Democrats and Technocrats," with Cass Sunstein. Journees d'études juridiques Jean Dabin (2004).
"Competitive, Deliberative, and Rights-Oriented Democracy," 3 Election Law Journal 685 (2004).

See also
 List of law clerks of the Supreme Court of the United States (Seat 10)
 Shaw v. Reno

References

External links
NYU School of Law Faculty Page

American lawyers
American legal scholars
Law clerks of the Supreme Court of the United States
Living people
New York University faculty
New York University School of Law faculty
Harvard Law School alumni
Princeton University alumni
University of Michigan Law School faculty
Year of birth missing (living people)